The 1992 ECAC Hockey Men's Ice Hockey Tournament was the 31st tournament in league history. It was played between March 3 and March 14, 1992. Preliminary and quarterfinal games were played at home team campus sites, while the 'final four' games were, for the final time, played at the Boston Garden in Boston, Massachusetts. By winning the tournament, St. Lawrence received the ECAC's automatic bid to the 1992 NCAA Division I Men's Ice Hockey Tournament.

Format
The tournament featured four rounds of play. The two teams that finish below tenth place in the standings are not eligible for tournament play. Each round was a single-elimination series. In the preliminary round, the seventh and tenth seeds and the eighth and ninth seeds each play to determine the final qualifying teams for the quarterfinals. In the quarterfinals the first seed and lower ranked qualifier, the second and higher ranked qualifier, the third seed and sixth seed and the fourth seed and fifth seed played. In the semifinals, the highest remaining seed plays the lowest remaining seed while the two other teams play with the winners advancing to the championship game. The tournament champion receives an automatic bid to the 1992 NCAA Division I Men's Ice Hockey Tournament.

Conference standings
Note: GP = Games played; W = Wins; L = Losses; T = Ties; PTS = Points; GF = Goals For; GA = Goals Against

Bracket
Teams are reseeded after the first two rounds

Note: * denotes overtime period(s)

Preliminary round

(7) Vermont vs. (10) Rensselaer

(8) Colgate vs. (9) Princeton

Quarterfinals

(1) Harvard vs. (10) Rensselaer

(2) St. Lawrence vs. (9) Princeton

(3) Clarkson vs. (6) Brown

(4) Yale vs. (5) Cornell

Semifinals

(2) St. Lawrence vs. (10) Rensselaer

(3) Clarkson vs. (5) Cornell

Championship

(2) St. Lawrence vs. (5) Cornell

Tournament awards

All-Tournament Team
F Marko Tuomainen (Clarkson)
F Mike Lappin (St. Lawrence)
F Chris Wells (St. Lawrence)
D Chris Lappin (St. Lawrence)
D Daniel Laperrière* (St. Lawrence)
G Parris Duffus (Cornell)
* Most Outstanding Player(s)

References

External links
ECAC Hockey
1991–92 ECAC Hockey Standings
1991–92 NCAA Standings

ECAC Hockey Men's Ice Hockey Tournament
ECAC tournament